Lin-Wood Public School in Lincoln, New Hampshire is a public primary and secondary school located in the White Mountains of New Hampshire, serving the communities of Lincoln and Woodstock (hence the name Lin-Wood, from Lincoln and Woodstock).

The school is operated by the Lincoln Woodstock Cooperative School District, the only "single school" SAU (School Administrative Unit) in the state. The school has students from kindergarten through 12th grade in its elementary, middle and high schools, which are located on one campus. Grades K-5 are housed in a building first opened for the 1991–92 school year, while grades 6–12 attend classes in a building originally built in 1963 to house the first cooperative Linwood High School (SAU 68).

Awards
The Middle School was named New Hampshire's Northeast Regional Middle School of Excellence by the New Hampshire Excellence in Education Awards Program in 1995, 1996 and 1997. In the winter of 2011/2012 the school got an award for submitting presents to troops in Iraq. In 2013, Lin-Wood High School was named the best high school in New Hampshire. The elementary school was given a Blue Ribbon Award for the improvement in test scores.

Athletics 
The school has teams in baseball, softball, basketball, soccer, cross country and skiing.

Clubs 
Many clubs and group activities run from Movie Maker, Destination Imagination, Parent/Child Book Club, Student Council, Youth and Government, Yearbook, 100 Mile Club, Homework Club, and many others.

Academics 
The May 2006 NHEIAP educational assessment report showed the school's high-school aged children performed above state averages in both math and reading.

Lin-wood had 96 students as of 2005 in grades 9–12. 
 White (95.4%)
 Asian (3.7%)
 African-American (0.9%)

References

External links
Lin-Wood Public Schools official website

Schools in Grafton County, New Hampshire
Public high schools in New Hampshire
Public middle schools in New Hampshire
Public elementary schools in New Hampshire
Lincoln, New Hampshire